The European championships in sailing are a series of sailing championships in Europe organized or sanctioned by the European Sailing Federation (EUROSAF).

List of championships

EUROSAF championships

Class championships

Centreboard classes

Keelboat classes

Multihull classes

Board classes

References

 
European championships
EUROSAF